The Big Green Island, part of the Big Green Group within the Furneaux Group, is a  granite island with limestone and  dolerite outcrops, located in Bass Strait west of Flinders Island, in Tasmania, in south-eastern Australia. The island is partly contained within a nature reserve with the rest being used for farming; and is part of the Chalky, Big Green and Badger Island Groups Important Bird Area.

Besides the Big Green Island, other islands that comprise the Big Green Group include the Chalky, East Kangaroo, Isabella, Little Chalky and Mile islands.

Fauna
Recorded breeding seabird and wader species are the little penguin, short-tailed shearwater, Pacific gull, silver gull, sooty oystercatcher, pied oystercatcher, black-faced cormorant and Caspian tern. Cape Barren geese also breed on the island.  Reptiles present include the metallic skink and Bougainville's skink. Rats are common.

See also

 List of islands of Tasmania

References

Furneaux Group
Important Bird Areas of Tasmania
Islands of Bass Strait
Islands of North East Tasmania